At least three bands have used the name Pharaohs:

A 1960s American pop music group fronted by Sam the Sham.
The Pharaohs, a soul/jazz/funk band formed in 1962 and active in the seventies, featuring Maurice White.
A metal band from Fredericton, N.B. formed in 2008.

See also
 Pharaoh (disambiguation)